Japan women's junior national softball team is the junior under-19 national team for Japan.

Competitions

References

External links 
 International Softball Federation

Women's national under-18 softball teams
Softball in Japan
Youth sport in Japan
Softball